Carlos Jose Rodiles (born 3 May 1975) is a Spanish professional golfer who currently plays on the European Tour.

Early life
Rodiles was born in Málaga, Spain.
Nowadays he lives in Marbella, Spain.

College career
He attended the University of Florida in Gainesville, Florida, United States, where he played for coach Buddy Alexander's Florida Gators men's golf team in National Collegiate Athletics Association (NCAA) competition in 1996 and 1997.  As a Gators golfer, Rodiles was a member of the team that was the Southeastern Conference (SEC) runner-up  and finished sixth in the NCAA tournament in 1996.  He graduated from the University of Florida with a bachelor's degree in finance in 1998.

Professional career
Rodiles turning professional in 1997.  He first qualified for the European Tour at the 1998 qualifying school.  He finished 160th on the Order of Merit in his rookie season, and dropped down to the second tier Challenge Tour for the following season. He regained his European Tour card by finishing third on the Challenge Tour Rankings in 2000, when he had three runner-up finishes. He managed to maintain his playing status on the elite tour until the end of 2005 through his position on the Order of Merit. He relied on invitations in 2006, before regaining his card when he returned to, and was medalist at the European Tour Qualifying School final stage in 2006. However having dropped outside the top 120 on the money list again in 2008, and having failed to come though final qualifying, Rodiles was again playing on the Challenge Tour in 2009.

Rodiles' best year to date has been 2003, when he ended the season in 24th place on the European Tour Order of Merit after losing out in a playoff to Freddie Jacobson at the season ending Volvo Masters Andalucia.

Amateur wins
1994 Tournament of the Americas

Playoff record
European Tour playoff record (0–1)

Challenge Tour playoff record (0–2)

Results in major championships

Note: Rodiles only played in The Open Championship.
CUT = missed the half-way cut

See also

2006 European Tour Qualifying School graduates
2009 Challenge Tour graduates
List of University of Florida alumni

References

External links

Spanish male golfers
Florida Gators men's golfers
European Tour golfers
Sportspeople from Málaga
1973 births
Living people